David Leo is a writer in Singapore. Leo received a Publishers Prize for Ah … The Fragrance of Durians & Other Stories in 1993, a (Singapore) National Book Department Council Book Awards for works in English in 1994 for The Sins of the Father and Singapore Literature Prize commendation in 1995 for Wives, Lovers and Other Women.

He is also the author of Different Strokes, a novel published in 1993 on two AIDS victims and a reporter who interviews them. The novel explores societal views on AIDS and its victims.

Some of David's short stories have won prizes in writing competitions in Singapore. He also writes poetry; some of his poems have appeared in various publications including Singa, Focus, Breakthrough, Project Alpha Silver, and an anthology of 20th Century Poets published in the UK

Leo works as an Assistant General Manager at the Singapore Airport Terminal Services.

Works

Different Strokes
Different Strokes is a novel written by David Leo and published in 1993. Through a character of a reporter named Keith, the novel explores the life of two AIDS victims, and describes their suffering and the dilemmas they face in the course of their illness. The work is among the earliest work in Singapore related to the gay community.

Novels, short stories and non-fiction  
 Somewhere a Tiny Voice (1993)
 Ah ... the Fragrance of Durians''' (1993)
 The Sins of the Father and Other Stories (1993)
 Different Strokes (1993)
 Wives, Lovers & Other Women (1995)
 Kiasu, Kiasi, You Think What (1995)  (see Kiasu)
 One Journey, Many Rivers (1997)
 Shakespeare Can Wait (2001)
 News at Nine (2003)
 Life's So Like Dat (2005)
 iDENTiTY (2008)
 Ubin Dreaming (You've Been Dreaming) (2012)
 Cherry Days'' (2015)

Anthologies  
 No Other City – The Ethos Anthology of Urban Poetry
 Love Gathers All – The Philippines-Singapore Anthology of Love Poetry
 Rhythms – A Singapore Anthology of Millenium Poetry
 Man/Born/Free: Writings on the Human Spirit from Singapore (edited by Gwee Li Sui)
 OnE, The Anthology – Short Stories from Singapore's best authors (edited by Robert Yeo)
 Sound of Mind – A teacher-writers anthology of poems and prompts
 Influence and Confluence: East and West / A Global Anthology on the Short Story (edited by Maurice A Lee), East
 China Normal University Press (Story was also translated into Chinese) 
 20th Century Poets

See also

 Singapore gay literature
 Gay literature

References

External links
Bio of David Leo
Publisher's website

Singaporean writers
Year of birth missing (living people)
Living people
Singaporean novelists
Singaporean male writers
Singaporean non-fiction writers
Singapore Literature Prize winners
Male non-fiction writers